The Ramsbottom trolleybus system once served the town of Ramsbottom, then in Lancashire, but now in Greater Manchester, England.

History

Services
By the standards of the various now defunct trolleybus systems in the United Kingdom, the Ramsbottom system was very small, with only one route, from Holcombe Brook railway station to Edenfield, with a short branch from Market Place in Ramsbottom to Ramsbottom railway station, which closed on 5 October 1914. Buses ran half-hourly.

Fleet
The system had a maximum fleet of only seven trolleybuses.

None of the former Ramsbottom trolleybuses is recorded as having survived.

See also

History of Ramsbottom
Transport in Ramsbottom
List of trolleybus systems in the United Kingdom

References

Notes

Further reading

External links
1913-1969 history of public transport in Ramsbottom with fleet lists
National Trolleybus Archive
British Trolleybus Society, based in Reading.
National Trolleybus Association, based in London.
Ramsbottom Heritage Society 3 trolleybus photos
Flickr photo - 1913 trolleybus at Woodcock Inn

Bus transport in Greater Manchester
Ramsbottom
Ramsbottom
Ramsbottom
History of transport in Greater Manchester